Espeland Falls is a  tall waterfall located in the Espeland Valley in Voss Municipality in Vestland county, Norway.  The falls are located just above large Lake Espeland, near the border of Voss and neighboring municipality of Ulvik.

One theory is that the erroneous information may have originated from a misunderstanding of the concept meters of head in relation to the development of the Espeland River for hydropower.

See also
List of waterfalls#Norway

References

Voss
Waterfalls of Vestland